Defending champion Rafael Nadal defeated Roger Federer in the final, 7–5, 7–6(7–3), 5–7, 6–1 to win the men's singles tennis title at the 2011 French Open. It was his sixth French Open title and tenth major title overall, tying Björn Borg's record for the most French Open titles won in the Open Era. It was the fourth time Nadal defeated Federer in the French Open final. Federer was attempting to become the first man in the Open Era and the third man overall to achieve a double career Grand Slam.

Nadal and Novak Djokovic were in contention for the world No. 1 ranking. Nadal retained the top ranking by defending the title. 

This edition of the tournament saw the top four seeds advance to the semifinals. Federer ended Djokovic's 43-match winning streak dating back to the 2010 Davis Cup Finals, as well as his 41–0 unbeaten 2011 season. Djokovic was only one win away from tying John McEnroe's 1984 record for the best unbeaten start to a season.

Although this was Nadal's sixth title at the French Open, it was the first time since 2001 in which the top seed won the title.

Seeds

Qualifying

Draw

Finals

Top half

Section 1

Section 2

Section 3

Section 4

Bottom half

Section 5

Section 6

Section 7

Section 8

References

External links
Official Roland Garros 2011 Men's Singles Draw
2011 French Open – Men's draws and results at the International Tennis Federation

Men's Singles
French Open - Men's Singles
French Open by year – Men's singles